Deep house is a subgenre of house music that originated in the 1980s, initially fusing elements of Chicago house with the lush chords of 1980s jazz-funk and touches of soul music. Its origins are attributed to the early recordings of Larry Heard (aka Mr. Fingers), including his influential track "Can You Feel It".

Characteristics
Deep house is known for tempos typically from 110 to 125 bpm, muted basslines, spacious use of percussion elements (typically using a Roland TR-909 drum machine), soft keyboard sounds (pads), use of advanced chord structures, ambient mixes, and soulful vocals. Lyrics usually focus on positive/uplifting themes or more melancholic subjects akin to blues. The use of vocals persisted in deep house as new forms of house music often abandoned them, but as of 2019, this difference has largely disappeared.

History
Deep house was largely pioneered by Chicago producers such as Marshall Jefferson (On the House) and Larry Heard (Mr. Fingers) and with tracks such as "Mystery of Love" (1985) and "Can You Feel It?" (1986); the latter had a similar impact on deep house to that of Derrick May's "Strings of Life" (1987) on Detroit techno. The jazzy sound became more common due to the favored use of gentler, more organic (yet still synthesizer based) production and instrument sounds. Author Richie Unterberger has stated that Heard's deep house sound moved house music away from its posthuman tendencies back towards the lush, soulful sound of early disco music (particularly that of old Philadelphia International and Salsoul records). "Can You Feel It" became a deep house blueprint; Heard used a Roland Juno-60 synthesizer to create the deep bassline, along with a Roland TR-909 drum machine for the beats.

DJ Ron Trent stated that the term was initially used to describe the DJ work of Frankie Knuckles and Ron Hardy, who departed from a strictly electronic house sound to incorporate eclectic elements like disco, jazz, and underground music.

In the 2000s and 2010s, the genre remained very popular. By around Aug 2014, however, the perception of the genre was resulting in a sense that some house music was being labeled deep inappropriately, and the term has since been used to encapsulate various types of bassline-driven house music, later named Brazilian bass or slap house, as the genre evolves from its historical origins.

Artists, DJs and record labels
For a list of deep house producers and disc jockeys, see: Deep house musicians.

Record labels of the genre include Alleviated Records (Larry Heard), Madhouse Records. Inc (Kerri Chandler), AFTR:HRS, Glasgow Underground, Naked Music, Om Records, Peacefrog Records, Soma, Source, Anjunadeep and Spinnin' Deep. Examples of deep house albums from artists known from other genres include The Martyr Mantras (1990) and Modernism: A New Decade (1989) from The Style Council.

See also
 List of electronic music genres
Club Zanzibar

References

 
20th-century music genres
21st-century music genres
House music genres